Sun King is a sobriquet of Louis XIV of France.

Sun King may also refer to:

 "Sun King" (song), by the Beatles
 Sun King (character), a fictional character in the Marvel Comics
 The Sun King (film), a 2005 Danish comedy

See also
 Sun King Brewing, a brewery in Indianapolis, Indiana
 Sun King Warriors, a band from Pittsburgh, Pennsylvania